is a Japanese professional boxer in the Light Flyweight division and a former World Boxing Association Minimumweight champion.

Professional career

Light flyweight

Japanese champion
Miyazaki made his professional debut against Daothong Teerasakgym on 24 December 2006. He won the fight by a second-round knockout. Miyazaki amassed a 9–0–2 record before being booked to face the #9 ranked WBC light flyweight contender Munetsugu Kayo for the Japanese light-flyweight title on 12 October 2009. He won the fight by technical decision in the tenth round, with scores of 99–94, 98–94 and 97–94. Miyazaki made his first title defense against the #1 ranked Japanese light flyweight contender Suguru Takizawa on 21 February 2010. The fight was ruled a draw by technical decision early in the fourth round. An accidental clash of heads left a cut on the left side of Takizawa's head, which left him unable to continue competing.

OPBF champion
Miyazaki challenged the #9 ranked WBC light flyweight contender Katsuhiko Iezumi for the OPBF light-flyweight title on 14 June 2010. He captured his second professional title by technical knockout, as he stopped Iezumi at the 2:41 minute mark of the eighth round. Miyazaki vacated the Japanese light flyweight title on 20 August 2010.

Miyazaki made his first OPBF light flyweight title defense against Junichi Ebisuoka on 21 October 2010. He won the fight by an eleventh-round technical knockout. The was stopped on the advice of the ringside physician, due to a cut on Ebisouka's right eye. Miyazaki made his second title defense against Donny Mabao on 12 June 2011. He won the fight by unanimous decision, with scores of 117–111, 118–110 and 119–110. Miyazaki made his third title defense with a fourth-round knockout of Jerson Mancio on 2 October 2011. Miyazaki made his fourth and final OPBF light flyweight title defense against Michael Landero on 20 June 2012, whom he beat by unanimous decision.

WBA minimumweight champion

Miyazaki vs. Porpramook
Miyazaki faced Pornsawan Porpramook for the vacant WBA minimumweight title on 31 December 2012, at the Osaka Prefectural Gymnasium in Osaka, Japan. The vacant championship bout took place on the undercard of the Kazuto Ioka and José Alfredo Rodríguez light flyweight title fight. Miyazaki captured the vacant belt by split decision. Judges Sergio Caiz and Wan Soo Yuh awarded him a 116–111 scorecard, while judge Levi Martinez scored the fight 114–113 for Porpramook.

Miyazaki vs. Velarde
Miyazaki made his first minimumweight title defense against Carlos Velarde on 8 May 2013, once against on the Kazuto Ioka undercard and once again at the Osaka Prefectural Gymnasium in Osaka, Japan. The owner of Miyazaki's gym furthermore announced he would award his fighter a ¥1,000,000 bonus, should he win by stoppage. Miyazaki retained the belt by a fifth-round technical knockout. Due to his struggles in making weight, he revealed he would move up to light flyweight in the near future.

Miyazaki vs. Silvestre
Miyazaki made his second WBA world title defense against the WBA interim minimumweight champion Jesús Silvestre on 11 September 2013. The fight was scheduled as the co-main event of the Kazuto Ioka and Kwanthai Sithmorseng WBA light flyweight championship bout and took place at the same venue as his previous two appearances. He retained the title by majority decision, with two judges scoring the fight 115–114 and 115–113 in his favor, while the third judge scored the fight an even 114–114. Miyazaki suffered cuts on his left eyelid and the corner of his right eye due to several accidental headbutts. He vacated the title on 2 October 2013, in order to move up to light flyweight.

Return to light flyweight
Miyazaki made his light flyweight debut against Teeraphong Utaida on 31 December 2013. He suffered his first professional loss, as Utaida knocked him out at the 2:22 minute mark of the third round. Miyazai bounced back with stoppage victories over Ichal Tobida on 16 September 2014 and Kajonsak Nattapolgym on 31 December 2014. He went on to notch two more stoppage victories the following year, as he knocked Nattawut Saisopa out on 22 April 2015 and Chaowalit Choedram on 31 December 2015.

His four-fight win streak earned Miyazaki the chance to challenge Ryoichi Taguchi for the WBA light-flyweight championship. The title bout took place at the Ota City General Gymnasium in Tokyo, Japan on 31 August 2016. He lost the fight by unanimous decision, with scores of 119–109, 116–112 and 117–111. Miyazaki failed to renew his boxing license afterwards and submitted a retirement notification to the Japanese boxing commission on 15 August 2017. In September 2017, Miyazaki was arrested for driving without a driver's license, which led to him being suspended by the Japanese boxing commission as well. Once his probation ended in May 2021, Miyazaki requested that his boxing license be renewed, which was approved soon after.

Miyazaki faced Takayuki Teraji in a 51.5 kg catchweight bout on 16 December 2021, following a five-year absence from the sport, in the co-main event of 3150 Fight Club. He won the fight by a third-round knockout. Miyazaki next faced Takumi Sakae in a flyweight bout on 29 April 2022. He won the fight by unanimous decision, with two scorecards of 77–75 and one scorecard of 78–74. His two-fight win streak was snapped by Azael Villar, who stopped him by technical knockout in the first round. Miyazaki returned on 27 November 2022 to face the journeyman Toma Kondo. The fight was ruled a split decision draw after eight rounds.

Professional boxing record

See also
List of Mini-flyweight boxing champions
List of Japanese boxing world champions
Boxing in Japan

References

External links

1988 births
Living people
People from Ōta, Gunma
Japanese male boxers
21st-century Japanese people
Mini-flyweight boxers
Light-flyweight boxers
Flyweight boxers
World mini-flyweight boxing champions
World Boxing Association champions